Shillya also spelled as Shilla or Silla is a village located in Lowa Ramgopalpur Gram Payanchayet in Galsi I CD Block in Bardhaman Sadar North subdivision of Purba Bardhaman district in West Bengal in India.

Geography
Shillya village is located at 23.2937 N 87.572952 E.

The village Shillya is situated on the bank of Damodar River which is the most important river of South Bengal after the river Hooghly. It is a very beautiful village to choose it as a picnic spot. Many people of nearby area like to come here to feast with their family or friends. It used to be a park (Shilla Damodar Park); but at the present it is damaged because of bad maintenance.

This Village is under Galsi (Vidhan Sabha constituency).

Climate
The Köppen Climate Classification sub-type for this climate is "Aw" (Tropical Savanna Climate).

Tap here to see the current weather (Galsi)

Transport
One can get there by the Paraj- Shilla Road. It is possible to use buses from Burdwan Nababhat Bus Stand or from Durgapur of Shillaghat. One can also use buses at Paraj More Bus Stand (beside NH 19).NH 19 is 11 km away from Shilla.

Population

The size of the village is not so big or small. It is a medium size village. There are 285 families and total population of the village is 1272. Among them 646 are males and 626 are females. There are 521 Scheduled Caste (259 males and 262 females) and 4 Scheduled Tribe (2 males and 2 females). The average sex ratio of this village is 969 which is greater than West Bengal average of 950. Literary rate of this village is 78.55% (male 83.39% and female 73.49%) which is also greater than West Bengal literacy which is 76.26%.
Here 40.96% of people are from Scheduled Caste and 0.31% people are from Scheduled Tribe.

Work Profile
Most of the villagers are connected with agriculture and Balighats (Collecting spots of river sand). Some people are connected with Government or Private Services.

Neighbourhoods
The village Shilla has neighbourhoods or paras.

Upper Shillya
It is known as Upper Shillya as this part has higher ground level than other parts of Shilla.

Namo Shillya
It is known as Namo Shilla (Namo means lower) because this part is lower than the other parts of Shilla.

Shillya ghat
It is known as Shillaghat/Shillyaghat (ghat means collecting centre of sand or bank of river) as it is the sand collecting spot.

Chance of Education
Children below five years are sent off to Anganwary (Integrated Child Development Services) centres. After the age of five years students study at Ramakrishna Sarada Mission Nivedita Pathamandir or Shilla FP School or Biringpur FP School. As there is no High School students who study at  Ramgopalpur High School which is at a distance of 3 km from Shilla from class 5. Students, who choose Science category study at Galsi (distance from Shilla 20 km) or Burdwan (distance from Shilla 40 km) or other places. The nearest college of Shilla is Galsi Mahavidyalaya (not for science students ). It is possible to get master's degree from Burdwan University.

Markets
Although there is a small market at Shillaghat; villagers usually prefer shopping at Ramgopalpur for their daily needs. There are many small stalls where villagers can buy things in the village.

Cultures
As the villagers are Hindu; they worship God through worship practices of Hinduism. There are two temples of Hindu goddess Durga at Upper Shilla. People from the area and from other districts come to Upper Shilla to worship goddess Durga. There are also three temples of Devi Kali and two temples of Devi Manasa at Upper Shilla. There is another temple of Durga at Namo Shilla. A small fair is organized here in the winter season (last day of Bengali month Poush) beside the river Damodar. This fair is called The mela(fair) of Poush Sankranti (last date of a month)

Shilla Ramakrishna Mission
There is a branch of Ramakrishna Mission at Shilla from January 1982. This organization helps people a lot. They have a primary school named Ramakrishna Sarada Mission Nivedita Pathamandir where students up to class 4 learn their primary lessons and ethics for good moral character. This organization also provides computer education for girl students. They also provide scholarships to successful students.
They are also engaged with to help More People:
They take tailoring, handicraft & cottage industry classes for ladies. They also have charitable homeopathic dispensary and they also supply medicines free.

See the video of their works

NGOs
Shilla Atma Shakti Club helps villagers when needed.

They are engaged with Animal Husbandry, Dairying & Fisheries, Aged/Elderly, Agriculture, Art & Culture, Biotechnology, Children, Civic Issues, Differently Abled, Disaster Management, Dalit Upliftment, Drinking Water, Education & Literacy, Environment & Forests, Food Processing, Health & Family Welfare, HIV/AIDS, Housing, Human Rights, Information & Communication Technology, Legal Awareness & Aid, Labour & Employment, Land Resources, Micro Finance (SHGs), Minority Issues, New & Renewable Energy.

Gallery

References

Villages in Purba Bardhaman district